Sogda is a genus of beetles belonging to the family Leiodidae.

The species of this genus are found in Europe and Northern America.

Species:
 Sogda ciliaris (Thomson, 1874) 
 Sogda enigma Peck & Cook, 2009

References

Leiodidae